is a Japanese comedian. She is represented by Sun Music Production. She is currently a member of the comedy duo Maple Chogoukin.

Filmography

TV drama

Films

Original video

TV variety

Former regular appearances

Former appearances
Special programmes

Occasional appearances

Internet programmes

Current appearances

Former appearances
Regular appearances

Other

Radio

DVD

References

External links
 
 

Japanese women comedians
1981 births
Living people
Comedians from Tokyo
21st-century Japanese actresses